Mycobacterium septicum is a species of Mycobacterium.

References

External links
Type strain of Mycobacterium septicum at BacDive -  the Bacterial Diversity Metadatabase

Acid-fast bacilli
septicum